Cedar Key is a city in Levy County, Florida, United States. The population was 702 at the 2010 census. The Cedar Keys are a cluster of islands near the mainland. Most of the developed area of the city has been on Way Key since the end of the 19th century. The Cedar Keys are named for the eastern red cedar Juniperus virginiana, once abundant in the area.

History

Early
While evidence suggests human occupation as far back as 500 BC, the first maps of the area date to 1542, when it was labeled "Las Islas Sabines" by a Spanish cartographer. The only ancient burial found in Cedar Key was a 2,000-year-old skeleton found in 1999. Arrow heads and spear points dating from the Paleo period (12,000 years old) were collected by Cedar Key historian St. Clair Whitman and are displayed at the Cedar Key Museum State Park.

Followers of William Augustus Bowles, self-declared "Director General of the State of Muskogee", built a watchtower in the vicinity of Cedar Key in 1801. The tower was destroyed by a Spanish force in 1802. In the period leading up to the First Seminole War, the British subjects Alexander Arbuthnot and Robert Ambrister used the Cedar Keys to deliver supplies to the Seminoles. The Cedar Keys may have been a refuge for escaped slaves in the early 1820s, and an entry point for the illegal slave trade later that decade.

Indian War
During the  Second Seminole War, the United States Army established Fort No. 4 on the mainland adjacent to the Cedar Keys. (The name "No. 4" was later applied to a boat channel next to the fort, and then to a railroad trestle and a highway bridge over that channel.) In 1840, General Zachary Taylor requested the Cedar Keys be reserved for military use for the duration of the war, and that Seahorse Key be permanently reserved for a lighthouse. In 1840, General Walker Keith Armistead, who had succeeded Zachary Taylor as commander of United States troops in the war, ordered construction of a hospital on what had become known as Depot Key. (The island's name may reflect the establishment of a depot there by Florida militia general Leigh Read. The primary depot for the U.S. Army in Florida at the time was at Palatka, Florida.) Depot Key was the headquarters for the Army in Florida, but Fishburne states headquarters was not in a fixed place, but wherever the commander was.

Cantonment Morgan was established on nearby Seahorse Key by 1841 and used as a troop deployment station and as a holding station for Seminoles who had been captured or who had surrendered until they could be sent to the West. A hurricane with a  storm surge struck the Cedar Keys on October 4, 1842, destroying Cantonment Morgan and causing much damage on Depot Key. Some Seminole leaders had been meeting with Army officers at Depot Key to negotiate their surrender or a retreat to a reservation in the Everglades. After the hurricane, the Seminoles refused to return to the area. Colonel William J. Worth had declared the war to be over in August 1842, and Depot Key was abandoned by the Army after the hurricane.

Pre-Civil War

In 1842, the United States Congress had enacted the Armed Occupation Act, a precursor of the Homestead Act, to increase white settlement in Florida as a way to force the Seminoles to leave the territory. With the abandonment of the Army base on Depot Key, the Cedar Keys became available for settlement under the act. Under the terms of the act, several people received permits for settlement on Depot Key, Way Key, and Scale Key. Augustus Steele, US Customs House Officer for Hillsborough County, Florida, and postmaster for Tampa Bay, received the permit for Depot Key, which he renamed Atsena Otie Key. In 1843, he bought the buildings on the island, and built some cottages for wealthy guests. In 1844, he became the Collector of Customs for the port of Cedar Key, as well as for Tampa, Florida. A post office named "Cedar Key" was established on Atsena Otie Key in 1845. The Florida legislature chartered the "City of Atseena Otie" in 1859.

Cedar Key became an important port, shipping lumber and naval stores harvested on the mainland. By 1860, two mills on Atsena Otie Key were producing "cedar" slats for shipment to northern pencil factories. As a result of the growth, the US Congress appropriated funds for a lighthouse on Seahorse Key in 1850. The Cedar Key Light was completed in 1854. Wood-frame residences were added to each side of the lighthouse several years later.

In 1860, Cedar Key became the western terminus of the Florida Railroad, connecting it to Fernandina Beach, Florida on the east coast of Florida. David Levy Yulee, U.S. senator and president of the Florida Railroad, had acquired most of Way Key to house the railroad's terminal facilities. A town was platted on Way Key in 1859, and Parsons and Hale's General Store, which is now the Island Hotel, was built there in the same year. On March 1, 1861, the first train arrived in Cedar Key, just weeks before the Civil War began.

Civil War era
With the advent of the American Civil War in 1861, Confederate agents extinguished the light at Seahorse Key and removed its supply of sperm oil. The defense of Cedar Key was assigned to the Columbia and New River Rifles, two companies of the 4th Florida Infantry Regiment, under the command of Lt. Colonel M. Whit Smith.  On July 3, 1861, four Federal war prize schooners appeared off Cedar Key. The schooners, originally captured by the USS Massachusetts off New Orleans, were under the command of U. S. Navy Lieutenant George L. Selden, nephew of former Treasurer of the United States William Selden, and manned by nineteen sailors. Col. Smith led his two rifle companies along with one six-pounder cannon twenty miles offshore on the steamer Madison and captured the schooners after firing two warning shots. With the recovery, Col. Smith and his men liberated fifteen Confederate sailors, recovered the vessels’ valuable cargo of railroad iron and turpentine and effected the first capture of a U. S. Naval officer at sea during the war.

The USS Hatteras raided Cedar Key in January 1862, burning several ships loaded with cotton and turpentine and destroying the railroad's rolling stock and buildings on Way Key. Most of the Confederate troops guarding Cedar Key had been sent to Fernandina in anticipation of a Federal attack there. Cedar Key was an important source of salt for the Confederacy during the early part of the war. In October 1862 a Union raid destroyed sixty kettles on Salt Key capable of producing 150 bushels of salt a day. The Union occupied the Cedar Keys in early 1864, staying for the remainder of the war.

In 1865, the Eberhard Faber mill was built on Atsena Otie Key. The Eagle Pencil Company mill was built on Way Key, and Way Key, with its railroad terminal, surpassed Atsena Otie Key in population. Repairs to the Florida Railroad were completed in 1868, and freight and passenger traffic again flowed into Cedar Key. The Town of Cedar Keys was incorporated in 1869, and had a population of 400 in 1870.

Early in his career as a naturalist, John Muir walked  from Louisville, Kentucky to Cedar Key in just two months in 1867. Muir contracted malaria while working in a sawmill in Cedar Key, and recovered in the house of the mill's superintendent. Muir recovered enough to sail from Cedar Key to Cuba in January 1868. He recorded his impressions of Cedar Key in his memoir A Thousand-Mile Walk to the Gulf, published in 1916, after his death.

Decline and restoration of wildlife 
When Henry Plant's railroad to Tampa began service in 1886, Tampa took shipping away from Cedar Key, causing an economic decline in the area. Earlier, growth in population had led to the Cedar Key town limits being expanded in 1881 and again in 1884. But with the decline in the local economy, the town limits were contracted in 1890. Also in 1890 the island town was affected by the reign of terror of Cedar Keys mayor William Cottrell, who took advantage of his Florida state legislature connections and the restricted one-way road access to impose his will and conduct acts of violence. He was deposed from power only after the island was invaded by a naval (U.S. Coast Guard) boat manned with a squad of U.S. Marshals, who were sent there after Custom House officers and other federal government workers requested federal aid due to being unable to discharge their duties on the islands.

The 1896 Cedar Keys hurricane was the final blow. Around 4 am on September 29, 1896, a  storm surge swept over the town, killing more than 100 people. The hurricane wiped out the juniper trees still standing and destroyed all the mills. A fire on December 2, 1896, further damaged the town. In following years, structures were rebuilt on Way Key, a more protected island inland, but the damage was done. Today, only a few reminders of the original town on Atsena Otie Key remain, including stone water cisterns, and a graveyard whose headstones conspicuously date prior to 1896. Also, many of the eastern red cedar trees that originally attracted the pencil company, and for which the community was named, are gone.

At the start of the 20th century, fishing, sponge hooking, and oystering had become the major industries, but around 1909, the oyster beds were exhausted. President Herbert Hoover established the Cedar Keys National Wildlife Refuge in 1929 by naming three of the islands as a breeding ground for colonial birds. The lighthouse was abandoned in 1952, just as the tourism industry began to grow as a result of interest in the historic community, but it remains in use as a marine biology research center by the University of Florida in Gainesville.

Present

The old-fashioned fishing village is now a tourist center with several regionally famous seafood restaurants. The village holds two festivals a year, the Spring Sidewalk Art Festival and the Fall Seafood Festival, that each attract thousands of visitors to the area.

In 1950, Hurricane Easy, a category-3 storm with  winds, looped around Cedar Key three times before finally making landfall, dumping  of rain and destroying two-thirds of the homes. The storm came ashore at low tide, so the surge was only .

Hurricane Elena followed a similar path in 1985, but did not make landfall. Packing  winds, the storm churned for two days in the Gulf,  to the west, battering the waterfront. All the businesses and restaurants on Dock Street were either damaged or destroyed, and a section of the seawall collapsed.

After a statewide ban on large-scale net fishing went into effect July 1, 1995, a government retraining program helped many local fishermen begin farming clams in the muddy waters. Today, Cedar Key's clam-based aquaculture is a multimillion-dollar industry.

A local museum exhibit displays a reproduction of one of the first air conditioning installations. The system, with compressor and fans, was used in Cedar Key to ease the lot of malaria patients.

Cedar Key is home to the George T. Lewis Airport (CDK).

Hurricane Eta made one of its two landfalls in Florida at about 4 a.m. Thursday, November 10, 2020, near Cedar Key, as a tropical storm.

National historic status

Cedar Key's importance in Florida's history, which began as far back as 1000 BC with pre-Columbian habitation of the region, was recognized on October 3, 1989, by the federal government. At that time,  in and around the town were added to the National Register of Historic Places under the title of the Cedar Keys Historic and Archaeological District.

The Cedar Key Museum State Park depicts the town's 19th century history and displays sea shells and Indian artifacts from the collection of Saint Clair Whitman. Tours of Whitman's restored 1920s house are available during museum hours. As the museum photo indicates, the building was constructed to withstand the hurricane conditions that the town is subjected to periodically.

The naturalist John Muir visited Cedar Key in 1867 on his historic walk from Kentucky to Florida. He wrote: For nineteen years my vision was bounded by forests, but today, emerging from a multitude of tropical plants, I beheld the Gulf of Mexico stretching away unbounded, except by the sky. What dreams and speculative matter for thought arose as I stood on the strand, gazing out on the burnished, treeless plain! The John Muir historic marker was placed on the museum grounds in 1983, commemorating his visit.

Geography

Climate

Cedar Key has a humid subtropical climate (Köppen Cfa) with hot, humid summers and mild winters.

Demographics

As of the census of 2000, there were 790 people, 411 households, and 244 families residing in the city. The population density was 864.7 inhabitants per square mile (335.2/km2). The racial makeup of the city was 97.47% White, 0.13% African American, 0.63% Native American, 0.25% Asian, 0.51% from other races, and 1.01% from two or more races. Hispanic or Latino of any race were 1.52% of the population.

There were 411 households, out of which 14.4% had children under the age of 18 living with them, 48.7% were married couples living together, 8.3% had a female householder with no husband present, and 40.4% were non-families. 34.8% of all households were made up of individuals, and 14.8% had someone living alone who was 65 years of age or older. The average household size was 1.92 and the average family size was 2.42.

In the city the population was spread out, with 13.2% under the age of 18, 4.8% from 18 to 24, 15.6% from 25 to 44, 40.1% from 45 to 64, and 26.3% who were 65 years of age or older. The median age was 54 years. For every 100 females, there were 91.7 males. For every 100 females age 18 and over, there were 92.2 males.

The median income for a household in the city was $32,232, and the median income for a family was $41,190. Males had a median income of $27,375 versus $31,806 for females. The per capita income for the city was $22,568. About 6.6% of families and 11.1% of the population were below the poverty line, including 10.5% of those under age 18 and 9.9% of those age 65 or over.

Education

School Board of Levy County operates a K–12 school, Cedar Key School.

Library
Levy County provides Cedar Key with a local library branch. The Cedar Key Public Library is in the renovated, historic Schlemmer Rooming House.

See also
 Florida Railroad
 Rosewood massacre

References

Bibliography

Further reading

External links

 
  From the application for listing on the National Register of Historic Places.
  At 
 

 
Cities in Levy County, Florida
Historic districts on the National Register of Historic Places in Florida
Populated coastal places in Florida on the Gulf of Mexico
National Register of Historic Places in Levy County, Florida
Cities in Florida